Judy MacDonald (born 1964) is a Canadian writer and journalist.

In addition to her published books, she has been associated with the online magazine Rabble and news programs for CBC Television, including The National, counterSpin and Face Off. She has also been a backing vocalist on albums by The Hidden Cameras.

Books
 Jane (1999)
 Grey: Stories for Grown-Ups (2001)

External links
 Judy MacDonald's blog

1964 births
Living people
20th-century Canadian novelists
Canadian bloggers
Writers from Toronto
Canadian women journalists
Canadian women novelists
Canadian women short story writers
Canadian women bloggers
20th-century Canadian women writers
20th-century Canadian short story writers
21st-century Canadian short story writers
21st-century Canadian women writers